John 20:26 is the twenty-sixth verse of the twentieth chapter of the Gospel of John in the New Testament. It records Jesus' reappearance to the disciples, including Thomas, eight days after his resurrection.

Content
The original Koine Greek, according to the Textus Receptus, reads:

In the King James Version of the Bible it is translated as:
And after eight days again his disciples were within, and Thomas with them: then came Jesus, the doors being shut, and stood in the midst, and said, Peace be unto you.

The modern World English Bible translates the passage as:
After eight days again his disciples were inside, and Thomas was with them. Jesus came, the doors being locked, and stood in the midst, and said, "Peace be to you."

For a collection of other versions see BibleHub John 20:26

Analysis
"After eight days" in Greek brings the chronology to the following Sunday after Easter.

The doors were again "locked",(Greek perfect verb: , ; same as in John 20:19) indicating the continuous fear among the disciples, but Jesus could enter and be in their midst.

The words "Peace be with you" is a common traditional Jewish greeting still in use today (shalom alekem or  shalom lekom; cf. ), also spoken by Jesus in John 20:19 and 21. Jesus' words of "peace" at this time can be seen as giving a reassurance for the disciples.

References

Sources

External links
Jesus Appears to His Disciples

20:26
John 20:26